The BRP Datu Sikatuna (PF-5) was one of the three ex-USN s that served with the Philippine Navy, the others being  and .

History

She served in the Pacific theatre in the middle of 1945, and received the unconditional surrender of all Japanese forces in the northern Palaus, which was received by the Americans in the wardroom on board Amick in September 1945. Amick was reassigned back to the Atlantic Fleet in December 1945 and remained in semi-active status until her decommissioning in May 1947.

Japan Maritime Self-Defense Force
She was transferred to the Japanese government as JDS Asahi (DE-262) on 14 June 1955. Together with her sistership JDS Hatsuhi (DE-263), they became one of the first warships of the newly organized Japan Maritime Self-Defense Force. As newer ships became available to the JMSDF, both ships were decommissioned and returned to the US Navy in June 1975.

Philippine Navy
Remained laid-up in Japan, she was transferred to the Philippine government on 13 September 1976 and was sold as Excess Defense Article on 23 December 1978. As a Philippine Navy ship, she was named RPS Datu Sikatuna (PS-77), and was towed to South Korea for an extensive refit in 1979. During this period South Korea also turned over 2 of their own ex-USN Cannon class ships to the US Navy in 1977, namely the Kyong Ki (DE-71) /USS Muir (DE-770) and Kang Won (DE-72) / USS Sutton (DE-771). These were also turned-over by the US to the Philippine government, which were later on cannibalized for use as parts hulk to upgrade and repair the Datu Sikatuna and her sistership Rajah Humabon, and provide both ships with additional guns and improve her machinery.

With these upgrades, she was formally commissioned to the Philippine Navy in 1980, and formed the backbone of the Philippine Fleet together with 2 of her sister ships and other ex-US Navy destroyer escorts. She was reclassified as BRP Datu Sikatuna (PF-5) in July 1980, now using the "BRP" ship naming standard and carrying a "Frigate" classification, and served until 1989, when she was decommissioned and scrapped. She became a parts hulk for the remaining ship of her class, the BRP Rajah Humabon (PF-11).

References

External links
 Philippine Navy Official website
 Philippine Fleet Official Website
 Philippine Defense Forum
 NavSource Online: Destroyer Escort Photo Archive
 Hazegray World Navies Today: Philippines
 Naming and Code Designation of PN Ships

Datu Kalantiaw-class frigates
Ships built in Kearny, New Jersey
1943 ships